Séglien is a commune in the Morbihan department of Brittany in north-western France.

Demographics
Inhabitants of Séglien are called in French Ségliennais.

Geography

Séglien is border by Silfiac to the north, by Langoëlan to the west, by Locmalo and Guern to the south and by Malguénac and  Cléguérec to the east. Historically, Séglien belongs to Vannetais. The river Sarre, a tributary of the river Blavet, flows through the commune.

Map

History

From the roman period there remains a section of the roman road connecting Castennec to Carhaix, passing through Mané-Guégan, Quénécalec and Resterhierven. On this road, no far from Saint-Germain, there is a mutilated cylindrical stone, which could habe been a milestone.

Gallery

See also
Communes of the Morbihan department

References

External links

Official website 

 Mayors of Morbihan Association 

Communes of Morbihan